Jalan Serdang, consisting of Jalan Raya 5 and Jalan UPM (Selangor state route B13) is a dual-carriageway state roads in Klang Valley region, Selangor, Malaysia.

List of junctions

Roads in Selangor